Electronic Attack Squadron 132 (VAQ-132), the "Scorpions", is a United States Navy aircraft squadron based at Naval Air Station Whidbey Island, flying the EA-18G Growler. The squadron's radio callsign is "Scorp".

History

Electronic Warfare Squadron 132 can trace its history all the way back to Patrol Squadron 911 (VP-911, later VP-29), established in 1946.

VAH-2
In November 1955, VP-29 personnel formed the nucleus of the squadron Heavy Attack Squadron Two (VAH-2) "Royal Rampants" and transitioned to the A3D Skywarrior and changed its homeport the following year to NAS Whidbey Island.

During the Vietnam War detachments from VAH-2 were deployed on the following aircraft carriers operating on Yankee and Dixie Stations:
 
5 August 1964 – 6 May 1965, Detachment M A-3Bs were embarked on 
7 December 1964 – 1 November 1965, A-3Bs were embarked on 
10 December 1965 – 25 August 1966, Detachment F A-3Bs were embarked on USS Ranger
29 July 1966 – 23 February 1967, Detachment A A-3Bs were embarked on USS Coral Sea
19 November 1966 – 6 July 1967, Detachment M A-3Bs were embarked on 
26 July 1967 – 6 April 1968, KA-3Bs were embarked on USS Coral Sea
4 November 1967 – 25 May 1968, Detachment 61 KA-3Bs were embarked on USS Ranger
3 January-18 July 1968, Detachment 65 KA-3Bs were embarked on USS Enterprise
29 May 1968 – 31 January 1969, Detachment 64 KA-3Bs were embarked on

VAQ-132
In November 1968, VAH-2 was redesignated as Tactical Electronic Warfare Squadron 132 (VAQ-132) and transitioned to the EKA-3B. In January 1971, they received the EA-6B Prowler and became the first operational squadron to transition to the new aircraft.

On 7 November 2008, VAQ-132 held their ceremonial last flight in the Grumman EA-6B Prowler and began the transition to the brand-new, Boeing EA-18G Growler in February 2009 with flight certification in mid-2009. Initial operational capability (IOC) was achieved on 22 September 2009, making them the first operational EA-18G squadron.

On 5 August 2009, EA-18Gs from VAQ-132 and Electronic Attack Squadron 129 (VAQ-129) completed their first at-sea carrier-arrested landing (trap) aboard .

The United States Navy's new Boeing EA-18G Growler ( "Grizzly" )  was first used in combat during Operation Odyssey Dawn by supporting efforts to enforce a UN no-fly-zone over Libya. The five EA-18Gs of VAQ-132 "Scorpions" were redeployed from Al' Asad Air Base, Iraq to Aviano Air Base, Italy to support Libya operations.

References

External links
VAQ-132 official website

See also
 History of the United States Navy
 List of United States Navy aircraft squadrons

Electronic attack squadrons of the United States Navy
Military units and formations in Washington (state)